Elliott is a small unincorporated community in Robertson County, Texas, at the junction of U.S. Highway 79 and Farm Road 2549, approximately  southwest of Franklin. It was established in 1871 as a station on the International–Great Northern Railroad, and named after the landowner, who donated his property for the townsite. The town's population has fluctuated between 20 and 50. From 1895–1916 it had its own post office; prior to that, between 1890–1892, a post office named Una operated in the town.  

In 1902 a gazeteer described Elliott as a post-village. The area is home to the Elliott Cemetery.

References

Unincorporated communities in Robertson County, Texas
Unincorporated communities in Texas
Bryan–College Station